Zdeněk Návrat (born 25 May 1931) is a Czech former ice hockey player who competed in the 1956 Winter Olympics. He was born in Děhylov.

References

1931 births
Living people
Czech ice hockey right wingers
Olympic ice hockey players of Czechoslovakia
Ice hockey players at the 1956 Winter Olympics
People from Opava District
HC Vítkovice players
HC Kometa Brno players
Sportspeople from the Moravian-Silesian Region
Czechoslovak ice hockey right wingers